Su Tiren (1888–1979) was a Republic of China politician. He was born in Shuozhou, Shanxi. During the Second Sino-Japanese War, he governed his home province initially on behalf of the Provisional government of Wang Kemin and after 1940, for the government of Wang Jingwei in Nanjing. In 1943, he was briefly mayor of Beijing. After the defeat of the Japanese in World War II, he went to Taiyuan where he served under Yan Xishan. With the fall of Beijing and Taiyuan to the communists in the Chinese Civil War, he fled to Lanzhou, Gansu before making his way to Hong Kong. He died in Taiwan.

References

Bibliography
 
 
 
 
1888 births
1979 deaths
Republic of China politicians from Shanxi
Chinese collaborators with Imperial Japan
Mayors of Beijing
Politicians from Shuozhou